Oxford Area High School (OAHS) is the only secondary school in the Oxford Area School District. It is in Oxford in Chester County, Pennsylvania, United States. The first high school in Oxford was established in 1869 and the latest building was opened in 2005. The student body consists of about 1,200 students. The previous building, heavily renovated, is now the Penn's Grove Middle School.

References

External links
 

Public high schools in Pennsylvania
Schools in Chester County, Pennsylvania
Educational institutions established in 1869
1869 establishments in Pennsylvania